Samuel Monday Ayinoko Abu (born 12 November 1993), known as Monday Samuel, is a Nigerian and Swedish footballer who plays as a midfielder for Clyde.

References

External links

1993 births
Living people
Nigerian footballers
Nigerian expatriate footballers
Association football midfielders
ABS F.C. players
S.L. Benfica footballers
Östersunds FK players
Helsingborgs IF players
Landskrona BoIS players
Thanh Hóa FC players
Varbergs BoIS players
IFK Malmö Fotboll players
Clyde F.C. players
Scottish Professional Football League players
Allsvenskan players
Superettan players
V.League 1 players
Division 2 (Swedish football) players
Nigerian expatriate sportspeople in Portugal
Nigerian expatriate sportspeople in Sweden
Nigerian expatriate sportspeople in Vietnam
Nigerian expatriate sportspeople in Israel
Nigerian expatriate sportspeople in Scotland
Expatriate footballers in Portugal
Expatriate footballers in Sweden
Expatriate footballers in Vietnam
Expatriate footballers in Israel
Expatriate footballers in Scotland